Roscoe Bowman (March 21, 1900 – September 24, 1964) was an American fencer. He competed in the individual and team sabre events at the 1920 Summer Olympics.

References

External links
 

1900 births
1964 deaths
American male sabre fencers
Olympic fencers of the United States
Fencers at the 1920 Summer Olympics
People from Carroll, Iowa